Antiphospholipid syndrome, or antiphospholipid antibody syndrome (APS or APLS), is an autoimmune, hypercoagulable state caused by antiphospholipid antibodies. APS provokes blood clots (thrombosis) in both arteries and veins as well as pregnancy-related complications such as miscarriage, stillbirth, preterm delivery, and severe preeclampsia. Although the exact etiology of APS is still not clear, genetics is believed to play a key role in the development of the disease. The diagnostic criteria require one clinical event (i.e. thrombosis or pregnancy complication) and two positive blood test results spaced at least three months apart that detect lupus anticoagulant, anti-apolipoprotein antibodies, or anti-cardiolipin antibodies.

Antiphospholipid syndrome can be primary or secondary. Primary antiphospholipid syndrome occurs in the absence of any other related disease. Secondary antiphospholipid syndrome occurs with other autoimmune diseases, such as systemic lupus erythematosus. In rare cases, APS leads to rapid organ failure due to generalised thrombosis; this is termed "catastrophic antiphospholipid syndrome" (CAPS or Asherson syndrome) and is associated with a high risk of death.

Antiphospholipid syndrome often requires treatment with anticoagulant medication such as heparin to reduce the risk of further episodes of thrombosis and improve the prognosis of pregnancy. Warfarin (brand name Coumadin) is not used during pregnancy because it can cross the placenta, unlike heparin, and is teratogenic.

Signs and symptoms
The presence of antiphospholipid antibodies (aPL) in the absence of blood clots or pregnancy-related complications does not indicate APS (see below for the diagnosis of APS).
Antiphospholipid syndrome can cause arterial or venous blood clots, in any organ system, or pregnancy-related complications. In APS patients, the most common venous event is deep vein thrombosis of the lower extremities, and the most common arterial event is stroke. In pregnant women affected by APS, there is an increased risk of recurrent miscarriage, intrauterine growth restriction, and preterm birth. A frequent cause of such complications is placental infarctions.
In some cases, APS seems to be the leading cause of intellectual and/or developmental disabilities in the newborn, due to an aPL-induced inhibition of trophoblast differentiation. The antiphospholipid syndrome is responsible for most of the miscarriages in later trimesters seen in concomitant systemic lupus erythematosus and pregnancy.

Other common findings, although not part of the APS classification criteria, are low platelet count, heart valve disease, and livedo reticularis. There are also associations between antiphospholipid antibodies and different neurologic manifestations including headache, migraine, epilepsy, and dementia. Some studies have shown the presence of antiphospholipid antibodies in the blood and spinal fluid of patients with psychological symptoms. Cancer is also observed to comorbid in patients with APS.

Risk factors
Risk factors for developing antiphospholipid syndrome include:
 Genetic Markers: HLA-DR4, HLA-DR7, and HLA-DRw53
 Race: Blacks, Hispanics, Asians, and Native Americans

Pathogenesis
Antiphospholipid syndrome is an autoimmune disease, in which "antiphospholipid antibodies" (anticardiolipin antibodies and lupus anticoagulant) react against proteins that bind to anionic phospholipids on plasma membranes. Like many autoimmune diseases, it is more common in women than in men. In fact, antiphospholipid syndrome affects women around five times more commonly than men. The syndrome is typically diagnosed between the ages of 30 and 40. The exact cause is not known, but activation of the system of coagulation is evident. Clinically important antiphospholipid antibodies (those that arise as a result of the autoimmune process) are associated with thrombosis and vascular disease.  The syndrome can be divided into primary (no underlying disease state) and secondary (in association with an underlying disease state) forms.

Anti-ApoH and a subset of anti-cardiolipin antibodies bind to ApoH. ApoH inhibits protein C, a glycoprotein with important regulatory function of coagulation (inactivates Factor Va and Factor VIIIa). Lupus anticoagulant antibodies bind to prothrombin, thus increasing its cleavage to thrombin, its active form.

In APS there are also antibodies binding to protein S, which is a co-factor of protein C. Thus, anti-protein S antibodies decrease protein C efficiency.

Annexin A5 forms a shield around negatively charged phospholipid molecules, thus reducing their availability for coagulation. Thus, anti-annexin A5 antibodies increase phospholipid-dependent coagulation steps.

The lupus anticoagulant antibodies are those that show the closest association with thrombosis; those that target β2glycoprotein 1 have a greater association with thrombosis than those that target prothrombin.
Anticardiolipin antibodies are associated with thrombosis at moderate to high titres (over 40 GPLU or MPLU).
Patients with both lupus anticoagulant antibodies and moderate or high titre anticardiolipin antibodies show a greater risk of thrombosis than with one alone.

The increased risks of recurrent miscarriage, intrauterine growth restriction and preterm birth by antiphospholipid antibodies, as supported by in vitro studies, include decreased trophoblast viability, syncytialization and invasion, deranged production of hormones and signalling molecules by trophoblasts, as well as activation of coagulation and complement pathways.

Diagnosis
Antiphospholipid syndrome is diagnosed using either liquid-phase coagulation assays to detect lupus anticoagulant or solid phase ELISA (enzyme-linked immunosorbent assay) to detect anti-cardiolipin antibodies or anti-apolipoprotein antibodies.

Genetic thrombophilia is part of the differential diagnosis of APS and can coexist in some patients with APS. Presence of genetic thrombophilia may determine the need for anticoagulation therapy. Thus, genetic thrombophilia screening can consist of:
 Screening for factor V Leiden variant and the prothrombin G20210A and MTHFR mutations.
 Measuring serum levels of protein C, free and total protein S, factor VIII, antithrombin, plasminogen, tissue plasminogen activator and plasminogen activator inhibitor-1.

Antiphospholipid antibodies do not recognize isolated cardiolipin, but bind to a cardiolipin-β2GPI (apolipoprotein H) complex.  The use of testing for antibodies specific for individual targets of aPL such as β2 glycoprotein 1 and phosphatidylserine is currently under debate.

Lupus anticoagulant
This is tested for by using a minimum of two coagulation tests that are phospholipid-sensitive, due to the heterogeneous nature of the lupus anticoagulant antibodies. The patient on initial screening will typically have been found to have a prolonged partial thromboplastin time (PTT) that does not correct in an 80:20 mixture with normal human plasma (50:50 mixes with normal plasma are insensitive to all but the highest antibody levels). The PTT (plus 80:20 mix), dilute Russell's viper venom time, kaolin clotting time, dilute thromboplastin time, silica clotting time and prothrombin time (using a lupus-sensitive thromboplastin) are the principal tests used for the detection of lupus anticoagulant. These tests must be carried out on a minimum of two occasions at least 6 weeks apart and be positive on each occasion, demonstrating persistent positivity, to allow a diagnosis of antiphospholipid syndrome. This is to prevent patients with transient positive tests (due to infection etc.) being diagnosed as positive.

Distinguishing a lupus antibody from a specific coagulation factor inhibitor (e.g.: factor VIII) is normally achieved by differentiating the effects of a lupus anticoagulant on factor assays from the effects of a specific coagulation factor antibody.
The lupus anticoagulant will inhibit all the contact activation pathway factors (factor VIII, factor IX, factor XI and factor XII). Lupus anticoagulant will also rarely cause a factor assay to give a result lower than 35 iu/dl (35%) whereas a specific factor antibody will rarely give a result higher than 10 iu/dl (10%).
Monitoring IV anticoagulant therapy by the PTT ratio is compromised due to the effects of the lupus anticoagulant and in these situations is generally best performed using a chromogenic assay based on the inhibition of factor Xa by antithrombin in the presence of heparin.

Anticardiolipin antibodies
Anti-cardiolipin antibodies can be detected using an enzyme-linked immunosorbent assay (ELISA) immunological test, which screens for the presence of β2glycoprotein 1 dependent anticardiolipin antibodies. A low platelet count and positivity for antibodies against β2-glycoprotein 1 or phosphatidylserine may also be observed in a positive diagnosis.

Criteria
Classification with APS requires evidence of both one or more specific, documented clinical events (either a vascular thrombosis and/or adverse obstetric event) and the confirmed presence of a repeated aPL. The Sapporo APS classification criteria (1998, published in 1999) were replaced by the Sydney criteria in 2006. Based on the most recent criteria, classification with APS requires one clinical and one laboratory manifestation:
 Clinical:
 A documented episode of arterial, venous, or small vessel thrombosis — other than superficial venous thrombosis — in any tissue or organ by objective validated criteria with no significant evidence of inflammation in the vessel wall
 1 or more unexplained deaths of a morphologically normal fetus (documented by ultrasound or direct examination of the fetus) at or beyond the 10th week of gestation and/or 3 or more unexplained consecutive spontaneous abortions before the 10th week of gestation, with maternal anatomic or hormonal abnormalities and paternal and maternal chromosomal causes excluded or at least 1 premature birth of a morphologically normal neonate before the 34th week of gestation due to eclampsia or severe pre-eclampsia according to standard definitions, or recognized features of placental insufficiency
 Laboratory:
 Anti-cardiolipin IgG and/or IgM measured by standardized, non-cofactor dependent ELISA on 2 or more occasions, not less than 12 weeks apart; medium or high titre (i.e., > 40 GPL or MPL, or > the 99th percentile)
 Anti-β2 glycoprotein I IgG and/or IgM measured by standardized ELISA on 2 or more occasions, not less than 12 weeks apart; medium or high titre (> the 99th percentile)
 Lupus anticoagulant detected on 2 occasions not less than 12 weeks apart according to the guidelines of the International Society of Thrombosis and Hemostasis.

There are 3 distinct APS disease entities: primary (the absence of any comorbidity), secondary (when there is a pre-existing autoimmune condition, most frequently systemic lupus erythematosus, SLE), and catastrophic (when there is simultaneous multi-organ failure with small vessel occlusion).

According to a 2006 consensus statement, it is advisable to classify APS into one of the following categories for research purposes:
 I: more than one laboratory criterion present in any combination;
 IIa: lupus anticoagulant present alone
 IIb: anti-cardiolipin IgG and/or IgM present alone in medium or high titers
 IIc: anti-β2 glycoprotein I IgG and/or IgM present alone in a titer greater than 99th percentile

The International Consensus Statement is commonly used for Catastrophic APS diagnosis. Based on this statement, Definite CAPS diagnosis requires:
 a) Vascular thrombosis in three or more organs or tissues and
 b) Development of manifestations simultaneously or in less than a week and
 c) Evidence of small vessel thrombosis in at least one organ or tissue and
 d) Laboratory confirmation of the presence of aPL.

VDRL, which detects antibodies against syphilis, may have a false positive result in aPL-positive patients (aPL bind to the lipids in the test and make it come out positive), although the more specific test for syphilis, FTA-Abs, that use recombinant antigens will not have a false-positive result.

Treatment
In people without symptoms, no treatment is required. In people with antiphospholipid antibody-associated thrombosis, anticoagulants such as warfarin are used to prevent further thrombosis. If warfarin is used, the INR is kept between 2.0 and 3.0. Direct-acting oral anticoagulants may be used as an alternative to warfarin, but not in people who are "triple positive" with all types of antiphospholipid antibody (lupus anticoagulant, anticardiolipin antibody and anti-β2 glycoprotein I antibody).

Anticoagulation appears to prevent miscarriage in pregnant women. In pregnancy, low molecular weight heparin and low-dose aspirin are used instead of warfarin because of warfarin's teratogenicity. People with recurrent miscarriages are often advised to take aspirin and to start low molecular weight heparin treatment after missing a menstrual cycle. In refractory cases plasmapheresis may be used.

Prognosis
The long-term prognosis for APS is determined mainly by recurrent thrombosis, which may occur in up to 29% of patients, sometimes despite antithrombotic therapy.

History
Antiphospholipid syndrome was described in full in the 1980s, by E. Nigel Harris and Aziz Gharavi. They published the first papers in 1983. The syndrome was referred to as "Hughes syndrome" among colleagues after the rheumatologist Graham R.V. Hughes (St. Thomas' Hospital, London, UK), who brought together the team.

Research
APS ACTION (the AntiPhospholipid Syndrome Alliance for Clinical Trials and InternatiOnal Networking), is the first-ever international research network that has been created to design and conduct large-scale, multicenter clinical trials in persistently antiphospholipid antibody (aPL) positive patients. The network consists of a multidisciplinary group of physicians and investigators from around the world who are interested in antiphospholipid syndrome (APS) research. The primary mission of APS ACTION is to prevent, treat, and cure antiphospholipid antibody (aPL) associated clinical manifestations through high quality, multicenter, and multidisciplinary clinical research.

References

Bibliography
 
  A personal account of dealing with the condition.
  50 case studies to help you work out whether you have it.

External links 
 Antiphospholipid Syndrome Explained - Genome.gov

Coagulopathies
Rheumatology
Autoimmune diseases
Neurological disorders
Obstetrics
Syndromes affecting blood
Syndromes affecting the nervous system